Mary Joe Fernández and Zina Garrison were the defending champions, but lost in third round to Yayuk Basuki and Nana Miyagi.

Arantxa Sánchez Vicario and Larisa Savchenko Neiland won the title by defeating Jill Hetherington and Kathy Rinaldi 7–5, 5–7, 6–3 in the final.

Seeds
All seeded players received a bye into the second round.

Draw

Finals

Top half

Section 1

Section 2

Bottom half

Section 3

Section 4

References

 Official results archive (ITF)
 Official results archive (WTA)

Lipton Championships - Women's Doubles
Women's Doubles